Valvata virens is a species of freshwater snail in the family Valvatidae. It is known by the common name emerald valvata.

This species is endemic to California in the United States. Reports from adjacent states are invalid. Of the two valid occurrences reported in California, at least one is extirpated and the other is in an unknown location. NatureServe has listed the species with the conservation status "possibly extinct".

References

Valvatidae
Endemic fauna of California
Taxa named by George Washington Tryon
Taxonomy articles created by Polbot